Kasetsart University Station is a BTS Skytrain station, on the Sukhumvit Line in Bangkok, Thailand situated near Kasetsart University.

It was the Northern terminus station of the Sukhumvit line from 4 December 2019 until the opening of an additional 4 stations on the line toward Wat Phra Sri Mahathat on 5 June 2020.

References

See also 

 Bangkok Skytrain

BTS Skytrain stations
Railway stations opened in 2019